The 6th Georgia Infantry Regiment was an infantry regiment in the Confederate States Army during the American Civil War. It was organized at Macon, Georgia, in April 1861.

Future governor of Georgia, Alfred H. Colquitt, was elected its first colonel. The regiment fought in the Battle of Fredericksburg, the Battle of Antietam and participated in Stonewall Jackson's flank attack at the Battle of Chancellorsville. The unit later saw action at battery Wagner near Charleston, South Carolina, and the battle of Olustee near Ocean Pond, Florida.
The remnants and survivors of the regiment surrendered at Greenboro, North Carolina on April 26, 1865, to forces under the command of William T. Sherman.

Organization

Staff
Colonels
Alfred Holt Colquitt
John T. Lofton
Sampson Watkins Harris

Companies
 A Company (Sydney Brown Infantry) was formed in Hancock County, Georgia.
 B Company (Lookout Dragoons) was formed in Dade County, Georgia.
 C Company (Beauregard Rifles or Beauregard Volunteers) was formed in Houston County, Georgia.
 D Company (Butts County Volunteers) was formed in Butts County, Georgia.
 E Company (Crawford County Greys or Crawford Greys) was formed in Crawford County, Georgia.
 F Company (Camilla Guards or Mitchell County Independents or Mitchell Independents) was formed in Mitchell County, Georgia.
 G Company (Butler Vanguards) was formed in Taylor County, Georgia.
 H Company (Baker Fire Eaters) was formed in Baker County, Georgia.
 I Company (Twiggs County Guards) was formed in Twiggs County, Georgia.
 K Company (Gilmer Blues) was formed in Oglethorpe County, Georgia.

Battles
Yorktown Siege, Virginia (4/62)Williamsburg, Virginia (5/5/62)
Seven Pines, Virginia (5/31/62 - 6/1/62)
Seven Days Battles, Virginia (6/25/62 - 7/1/62)
Gaines’ Mill, Virginia (6/27/62)
Malvern Hill, Virginia (7/1/62)
South Mountain, Maryland (9/14/62)
Antietam, Maryland (9/17/62)
Fredericksburg, Virginia (12/13/62)
Chancellorsville, Virginia (5/1/63 - 5/4/63)
Grimball’s Landing, James Island, South Carolina (7/16/63)
Charleston Harbor, South Carolina (8/63 - 9/63)
Olustee, Florida (2/20/64)
Drewry’s Bluff, Virginia (5/16/64)
Petersburg Siege, Virginia (6/1/64 - 4/1/65)
Cold Harbor, Virginia (6/1/64 - 6/3/64)
Crater, Virginia (7/30/64)
Fort Harrison, Virginia (9/29/64 - 9/30/64)
Second Fort Fisher, North Carolina (1/13/65 - 1/15/65)
Carolinas Campaign (2/65 - 4/30/65)
Bentonville, North Carolina (3/19/65 - 3/21/65)

See also
List of Civil War regiments from Georgia

References
Cone, Daniel. Last to Join the Fight. Macon, GA: Mercer University Press.
http://battleofolustee.org/6th_ga_inf.html

External links
 

Units and formations of the Confederate States Army from Georgia (U.S. state)
1861 establishments in Georgia (U.S. state)